This is a list of national swimming records for Bermuda. These are the fastest times ever swum by a swimmer representing the country. These records are kept by Bermuda's national swimming federation: the Bermuda Amateur Swimming Association (BASA).

BASA keeps records for both for males and females, for long course (50m) and short course (25m) events. Records are kept in the following events (by stroke):
freestyle: 50, 100, 200, 400, 800 and 1500;
backstroke: 50, 100 and 200;
breaststroke: 50, 100 and 200;
butterfly: 50, 100 and 200;
individual medley: 100 (25m only), 200 and 400;
relays: 4x50 free, 4x100 free, 4x200 free (50m only), 4x50 medley, and 4 × 100 medley.

Long course (50m)

Men

|-bgcolor=#DDDDDD
|colspan=9|
|-

|-bgcolor=#DDDDDD
|colspan=9|
|-

|-bgcolor=#DDDDDD
|colspan=9|
|-

|-bgcolor=#DDDDDD
|colspan=9|
|-

|-bgcolor=#DDDDDD
|colspan=9|
|-

Women

|-bgcolor=#DDDDDD
|colspan=9|
|-

|-bgcolor=#DDDDDD
|colspan=9|
|-

|-bgcolor=#DDDDDD
|colspan=9|
|-

|-bgcolor=#DDDDDD
|colspan=9|
|-

|-bgcolor=#DDDDDD
|colspan=9|
|-

Mixed relay

Short course (25m)

Men

|-bgcolor=#DDDDDD
|colspan=9|
|-

|-bgcolor=#DDDDDD
|colspan=9|
|-

|-bgcolor=#DDDDDD
|colspan=9|
|-

|-bgcolor=#DDDDDD
|colspan=9|
|-

|-bgcolor=#DDDDDD
|colspan=9|
|-

Women

|-bgcolor=#DDDDDD
|colspan=9|
|-

|-bgcolor=#DDDDDD
|colspan=9|
|-

|-bgcolor=#DDDDDD
|colspan=9|
|-

|-bgcolor=#DDDDDD
|colspan=9|
|-

|-bgcolor=#DDDDDD
|colspan=9|
|-

References

External links
Bermuda Amateur Swimming Association website.

Bermuda
Records
Swimming records